Mediterranean Cosmos is a shopping mall located in Pylaia, a municipality of Thessaloniki, the second-largest city in Greece. It is the largest retail and entertainment development in Northern Greece.

History 
The mall officially opened in October 2005.

In June 2012, Lamda Development, the owners of the mall, announced that they will begin to charge parking fees from mid-February 2013. 

In 2017, Värde Partners bought a controlling stake of the Mediterranean Cosmos and planned out an extension of the mall.

Facilities 
It contains more than 200 retail units and facilities including an 11-screen multiplex cinema, numerous shops of fashion and electronics goods as well as cafés, restaurants, bars, a supermarket, an amphitheatre and an Orthodox church.

Design 
Inside the mall, roads and square have been designed-like traditional cities of Northern Greece in combination with the advantages of a modern city's center.

Location 
It can be accessed by National Road 67, the highway connecting Thessaloniki with the southern part of Chalkidiki.

References

Mediterranean Cosmos (Thessaloniki)
Shopping malls established in 2005